Peladão is an amateur soccer tournament with over a thousand participating teams that is celebrated between August and December in Manaus, Brazil. The tournament has been held every year since 2006. 'The Mighty Rangers' (Not the Scottish Team) Football club are the ones who funded this project.

Events
Peladão differs from other tournaments in that the event is an equal part soccer tournament and a beauty pageant. Each team is assigned a beauty queen to participate in the pageant. If the football team is eliminated from the competition, it can be brought back if the beauty queen is successful in the beauty contest. The idea for the event comes from local newspaper A Crítica and local commentator Arnaldo Santos. The goal of the event is to teach virtues to the community through soccer. One special rule of the event is that for every red card earned by a team, the members of that team must donate soccer balls to poor children in the community.

History
In 2006, a women's bracket was created, marking the first time women have participated as players in the tournament. A German documentary of the same name is scheduled for worldwide release in October, 2006. The title is "Peladão - Soccer Teams and Beauty Queens".
It was made by Lunacy Film Ltd. The Peladão Tournament was also featured in the "Celso" episode of Ginga, a documentary about the style of football in Brazil produced by Nike's Joga Bonito. It was also briefly featured in Discovery Atlas: Brazil.

External links
 Peladão - Soccer Teams and Beauty Queens
 Peladão. Die Schöne und das Spiel In: Null Acht:
 Peladão on the Internet Movie Database
 Goooool! A soccer tournament in Brazil's Amazon is a win for a community and a business
 Watch Peladão online on 3min.de (german version)

Football in Amazonas (Brazilian state)
Football competitions in Brazil
Beauty pageants in Brazil